Theodore Paul Hendricks (born November 1, 1947), nicknamed "the Mad Stork", is an American former professional football player who played as an outside linebacker for 15 seasons with the Baltimore Colts, Green Bay Packers, and the Oakland/Los Angeles Raiders in the National Football League (NFL). He was a member of four Super Bowl-winning teams, and was elected to the Pro Football Hall of Fame in 1990 after being elected to the College Football Hall of Fame in 1987. 

He is the first Guatemalan-born player in the NFL. He played college football for the Miami Hurricanes.

Early life
His parents met in Guatemala while working for Pan American Airlines. Hendricks was raised in Miami Springs, Florida. He was an honor student at Hialeah High School, where he competed in basketball, baseball, track and field and football. Hendricks was raised bilingual and speaks fluent Spanish.

University of Miami
Hendricks received 4 scholarship offers (baseball, basketball, football and academic) from the University of Miami.  He accepted the Academic scholarship and was an honors math and physics major.  He is best known for his football prowess while playing stand-up defensive end for the University of Miami during the 1966 through 1968 seasons. He was a three-time All-American (1966,1967, 1968) and finished fifth in the 1968 Heisman Trophy voting. While in college, Hendricks became a member of Kappa Sigma fraternity.

Collegiate records and accolades
While playing for Miami, Hendricks made 327 total tackles (the most ever by a Miami defensive lineman). He also led the team in solo tackles by a defensive lineman with 139.  Hendricks also recovered 12 fumbles during his playing career. He recorded a career-high of 4 quarterback sacks against the University of Florida in 1968. In his junior year of 1967 he caused nine turnovers.

It was at Miami that the tall, thin Hendricks gained the nickname "the Mad Stork."  It was a nickname that would follow him until his NFL days when he was simply called "the Stork". Hendricks' Miami jersey was retired in 1997. He was elected to the College Football Hall of Fame.

Hendricks was inducted into the University of Miami Sports Hall of Fame in 1980.

The Ted Hendricks Award is given annually to college football's top defensive end. The award is presented by his own 501(c)(3) foundation, the Ted Hendricks Foundation.

NFL career

Baltimore Colts
Hendricks began his pro football career as a second-round pick of the Baltimore Colts in the 1969 AFL-NFL Draft. He was initially listed as a defensive end, which is why he had the unusual number (for a linebacker) of 83. After coach Don Shula converted him to linebacker, he entered the starting lineup in the sixth game of his rookie 1969 season, the beginning of 69 consecutive starts with the Colts. He made 32 tackles and 2 sacks on the quarterback and knocked down 2 passes and blocked a field goal (the first of 25 blocked kicks in his career).

He played a key role in the Colts' 1970 Super Bowl V-winning season. He was the starting strong-side linebacker and recorded 67 tackles and 1-1/2 sacks while intercepting a pass. He also recorded 2 blocked kicks and knocked down 5 passes. He and fellow linebackers Mike Curtis and Ray May anchored a unit that was one of the NFL's best in defending against the run; which was 102.8 yards per game – 6th in the NFL, and allowing only 2 rushing touchdowns all season (tied with the Los Angeles Rams for first in the NFL). They allowed only 234 points, 7th in the NFL.

He was chosen to the first of four All-Pro selections in 1971. He had 63 tackles and picked off 5 passes while batting away 7 passes. He also recorded 5 sacks and blocked 2 more kicks. The Colts defense was ranked #1 in the NFL in fewest rushing yards allowed and lowest rushing attempt. The Colts made the playoffs but did not advance to the Super Bowl, losing to the Miami Dolphins.

In 1972 Hendricks recorded 99 tackles, 6 sacks, knocked down 7 passes, intercepted two passes and blocked 2 field goals. The following season Hendricks made 86 tackles and 4 sacks (bringing his Colt total to 18-1/2) and picked off 3 passes (making his Colt total 11) for 33 yards, while batting away 7 passes for the third consecutive season and blocking a punt. He was second-team All-Pro in both 1972 and 1973. He played the last of five seasons with the Colts without signing a contract.

Green Bay Packers
One week after signing to begin play in 1975 with the World Football League's Jacksonville Sharks, Hendricks was traded along with a 1975 second-round pick (28th overall–traded to Los Angeles Rams for John Hadl) from the Colts to the Green Bay Packers for Tom MacLeod and a 1975 eighth-round selection (192nd overall–Northwestern State running back Mario Cage) on August 13, 1974.

He was assigned jersey no. 56. Hendricks was then in the second straight option year of his NFL contract, and had one of his best seasons: five interceptions, seven blocked kicks (3 field goals, 3 punts and 1 extra point) and a safety, two sacks, 75 tackles, and two knocked down passes while again earning consensus All-Pro honors for the second time.

With the World Football League bankrupt, owner Al Davis of the Raiders sent two first round draft choices to the Packers for the rights to Hendricks, signing him as a limited free agent.

Oakland / Los Angeles Raiders
After the trade, Hendricks went on to nine seasons with the Raiders before retiring after the 1983 season. In his first year on the Raider team, coach John Madden used him sparingly, partly as a result of a feud Madden had with Al Davis. However, Madden eventually had him starting by the end of the 1975 season. Hendricks recorded only 27 tackles and 3 passes batted and 2 interceptions. He was used in the Raiders nickel defense and recorded 5 sacks in that role. He also recorded 4 sacks in a playoff win against the Cincinnati Bengals. Injuries limited the number of defensive lineman Madden had available so he used Hendricks as a stand-up defensive end, the position Hendricks played in college. At season's end the Raiders defense was among the NFL's top units, despite injuries to a few key defensive linemen. The Raiders led the NFL in interceptions and they ranked 2nd in the NFL in sacks, 7th in fewest points allowed, and were 3rd in total defense.

The next year Hendricks became a full-time player with the Raiders, and the Raiders switched to a 3–4 defense early in the season. Hendricks played the weakside linebacker, since All-Pro Phil Villapiano played Hendricks' strong-side; he made 57 tackles, 6 sacks, knocked down 5 passes while picking off one and blocking 2 punts. The Raiders defense was 6th in the NFL in sacks but did not finish in the top ten in points allowed or total defense. The Raiders won Super Bowl XI, the first in franchise history, and the first of three Super Bowl titles in seven seasons. Hendricks was second-team All-Pro for the first of three consecutive years.

In 1977, Hendricks moved back to the strong-side linebacker position due to Villapiano's injury and made 56 tackles, 2 sacks and knocked down 4 passes. The Raider defense was 7th in the NFL against the run and tied for 3rd in allowing the fewest rushing touchdowns. They also tied for third in the NFL with 26 interceptions.

In the 1978 season Hendricks recorded a stellar season with 78 tackles, 6 sacks, 3 interceptions, 8 passes defensed and 2 fumble recoveries. The defense tied for 4th in most interceptions in the NFL and scored 4 defensive touchdowns which tied them for 2nd most in the NFL. They were tied for 10th in fewest points allowed as well.

A vote among Raider coaches showed that all of them had voted to release Hendricks at season's end. However, owner Al Davis insisted on keeping Hendricks. Hendricks ended up making 76 tackles with a career-high 8-1/2 sacks, 3 interceptions (bringing his career total to 26) while batting 16 passes and blocking 3 kicks. The defense rebounded to #5 against the run in the NFL, #1 in intercepting passes, and were 3rd in sacking opponents quarterbacks, and 11th in the NFL in total defense and 10th in fewest points allowed. In 1980 he was a consensus first-team All-Pro for the first time since 1974 and he helped the Raiders to their win in Super Bowl XV while going to another Pro Bowl.

Hendricks was All-Pro and All-AFC in the strike-shortened 1982 season as Hendricks made 28 tackles and seven sacks in just nine games while he deflected 2 passes. The Raiders were 8–1 but were stunned in a playoff loss to the New York Jets. The Raider defense was as good as there was in the NFL for the 1982 season. They were 2nd in fewest rushing yards allowed and 2nd in sacking the opposing quarterback.

In his final campaign, 1983, Hendricks played less than at any point since 1975 but still made his eighth Pro Bowl and was second team All-AFC while recording 41 tackles, two sacks and deflecting four passes. He also blocked the 25th kick of his career and was a part of the Raiders Super Bowl XVIII victory. The defense was 4th in the NFL against the run, again tied for 2nd in sacking the quarterback, and fifth in total defense and 13th in allowing the fewest points allowed while being eighth in allowing the fewest touchdowns from scrimmage.

Of Note Accomplishments
Hendricks was a member of four Super Bowl-winning teams (three with the Raiders and one with the Colts) and was a Pro Bowl selection eight times, at least once with each of his three NFL teams.

Hendricks played in 215 consecutive regular-season games. He also participated in eight Pro Bowl games, seven AFC championships, and four Super Bowls (V with the Colts, XI, XV and XVIII with the Raiders). Hendricks was named All-Pro as a Colt in 1971, as a Packer in 1974, and twice as a Raider in 1980 and 1982. He also earned second-team All-Pro honors five other times (1972, '73, '76, '77, '78). He also earned All-conference honors in 1971, '72, '74, '76, '80, '81 and '82, while being named 2nd-team All-AFC in 1973, '78 and '83.

Hendricks was elected to the Pro Football Hall of Fame in 1990, his second year of eligibility.  In 1999, he was ranked number 64 on The Sporting News' list of the 100 Greatest Football Players.

He currently works on behalf of ex-players as part of the Hall of Fame Players Group.  HIs Ted Hendricks Foundation supports health, education and research programs.  The Annual Ted Hendricks Defensive End of the Year Award is presented to the most outstanding collegiate player each year.   He has been named as one of the members of the NFL's all time 75th anniversary team in 1994. During the commemoration of the 100th Anniversary of the NFL, Ted Hendricks was named 82nd in "Top 100: NFL's Greatest Players" of all time.

He has been awarded the Order of the Quetzal, the highest award for civilians, by his native Guatemala.

References

External links

 
 
 http://tedhendricks.com/bio-stats.htm

1947 births
Living people
People from Hialeah, Florida
Sportspeople from Guatemala City
Sportspeople from Miami-Dade County, Florida
Players of American football from Florida
American football linebackers
Miami Hurricanes football players
All-American college football players
College Football Hall of Fame inductees
Baltimore Colts players
Green Bay Packers players
Los Angeles Raiders players
Oakland Raiders players
American Conference Pro Bowl players
National Conference Pro Bowl players
Pro Football Hall of Fame inductees
Guatemalan emigrants to the United States
Hialeah Senior High School alumni